Nugent Home for Baptists is a historic private charity building at 221 W. Johnson Street in Philadelphia, Pennsylvania.  According to the New York Times of May 21, 1889:

The Renaissance style building was constructed in 1895 and added to the National Register of Historic Places in 2006.

The building adjoins the Presser Home for Retired Music Teachers, which was also listed on the National Register in 2006.  Nolen Properties owns both buildings and has completed restoration of the Presser building, and was working on the restoration of the Nugent building in 2013.

References

Buildings and structures on the National Register of Historic Places in Philadelphia
Renaissance Revival architecture in Pennsylvania
Residential buildings completed in 1895
Mount Airy, Philadelphia